WLEL is a radio station airing a Regional Mexican format licensed to Ellaville, Georgia, broadcasting on 94.3 MHz FM.  It is the only Spanish-language FM radio station serving the Hispanic Latino communities of Middle Georgia and West Central Georgia.  The station serves the areas of Americus, Georgia, Montezuma, Georgia, Perry, Georgia, Fort Valley, Georgia, Byron, Georgia, and Warner Robins, Georgia, and is owned by Summer Rose Broadcasting; Gorilla Broadcasting Company operates the station under a local marketing agreement.

References

External links
WLEL's official website

Regional Mexican radio stations in the United States
LEL
LEL
Radio stations established in 2009
2009 establishments in Georgia (U.S. state)